Patakht-e Shah Mohammad (also Romanized as Pātakht-e Shāh Moḩammad) is a village in Darreh Kayad Rural District, Sardasht District, Dezful County, Khuzestan Province, Iran. At the 2006 census, its population was 52, in 9 families.

References 

Populated places in Dezful County